KITI-FM (95.1 FM) is a radio station broadcasting a hot adult contemporary format. Licensed to Winlock, Washington, United States, it serves the Centralia-Chehalis area in western Washington.

External links
KITI-FM website

ITI-FM
Radio stations established in 1995